John William Berwick (30 November 1884 – 1948) was an English professional footballer who played in the Football League for Glossop and Everton as an inside right.

Personal life 
On 28 January 1915, five months after Britain's entry into the First World War, Berwick enlisted in the British Army. He served in the King's Shropshire Light Infantry, the Cheshire Regiment and finished the war as a corporal in the Labour Corps.

Career statistics

References

Military personnel from Northamptonshire
English footballers
English Football League players
British Army personnel of World War I

1884 births
1948 deaths
Association football inside forwards
Footballers from Northampton
Cheshire Regiment soldiers
King's Shropshire Light Infantry soldiers
Royal Pioneer Corps soldiers
Glossop North End A.F.C. players
Everton F.C. players